The 2000-01 Azerbaijan Top League was contested by 11 clubs and won by FK Shamkir.

Teams

Stadia and locations

League table

Results

Championship play-off

Season statistics

Top scorers

References

External links
Azerbaijan 2000-01 RSSSF
APL Stats

Azerbaijan Premier League seasons
Azer
1